This is a list of North American nations ranked by Gross Domestic Product (GDP) per capita in nominal terms, which are calculated at market or government official exchange rates. The figures provided are 2019 estimates from the IMF

See also
 List of North American countries by GDP (PPP) per capita
 Economic growth
 Economic reports

References

North America
North America
GDP
GDP
GDP